Shinagawa held a mayoral election on Sunday October 8, 2006.

Sources 

 Japan-Election.net coverage
 Shinagawa official result page 
 ザ・選挙 -選挙情報-

Local elections in Japan
Shinagawa
2006 elections in Japan
Mayoral elections in Japan
October 2006 events in Japan
2006 in Tokyo